Mercy Career & Technical High School is a private, Roman Catholic high school in Philadelphia, Pennsylvania. It is located within the Roman Catholic Archdiocese of Philadelphia.  It is the only four-year co-educational Catholic vocational high school in the United States.

History
Mercy was established in 1950 by the Sisters of Mercy.  The school was originally known as Mercy Technical School and did not start granting high school diplomas until 1973.

References

External links
 School website

Roman Catholic secondary schools in Philadelphia
Educational institutions established in 1950
1950 establishments in Pennsylvania
Sisters of Mercy schools
Upper North Philadelphia